New York's 126th State Assembly district is one of the 150 districts in the New York State Assembly. It has been represented by Republican John Lemondes Jr. since 2021, succeeding Gary Finch.

Geography
District 126 contains portions of Cayuga, Chenango, Cortland and Onondaga counties.

Recent election results

2022

2020

2018

2016

2014

2012

References 

126
Onondaga County, New York
Cayuga County, New York
Cortland County, New York
Chenango County, New York